Happier may refer to:

Happiness, an emotional state

Music
"Happier" (Ed Sheeran song), 2018
"Happier" (Marshmello and Bastille song), 2018
"Happier" (Olivia Rodrigo song), 2021
Happier, an album by Kid606, 2014
"Happier", a song by Paul Anka from The Painter, 1976
"Happier", a song by Guster from Lost and Gone Forever, 1999

See also
Happy (disambiguation)
Happiness (disambiguation)